Sauropus arenosus is a plant in the family Phyllanthaceae, native to Western Australia and the Northern Territory.

It is a spreading shrub growing from 0.5 to 1 m high. Its  yellow-green/red-pink flowers may be seen in May.

Distribution and habitat 
In Western Australia it is found growing on red sand dunes in the IBRA regions of the  Gibson Desert, the Great Sandy Desert, and the Little Sandy Desert.

References

External links
Sauropus arenosus occurrence data from Australasian Virtual Herbarium

arenosus
Plants described in 1997
Flora of Western Australia
Flora of the Northern Territory
Taxa named by Jeremy James Bruhl